KCVG, a radio station (89.9 FM) licensed to Hastings, Nebraska, which held the KFKX call sign from 1996 to 2016
 KFKX (1923-1933), an AM radio station licensed to Hastings, Nebraska and later Chicago, Illinois, which held the KFKX call sign from 1923 to 1933